is a Japanese judoka. He won a gold medal at the -90 kg category of the 2002 Asian Games.

He is from Toshima, Tokyo. He became famous with Keiji Suzuki and Yasuyuki Muneta, when he was a student of high school. After graduation from Meiji University, He belongs to Ryotokuji Gakuen.

Achievements

References

External links
 
 

Japanese male judoka
1980 births
People from Tokyo
Living people
Asian Games medalists in judo
Judoka at the 2002 Asian Games
Asian Games gold medalists for Japan
Medalists at the 2002 Asian Games